

Films

References 

LGBT
1993 in LGBT history
1993